Clupeosoma is a genus of moths of the family Crambidae.

Species
Clupeosoma astrigalis Hampson, 1917
Clupeosoma atristriata Hampson, 1917
Clupeosoma cicatricale Munroe, 1977
Clupeosoma cinerea (Warren, 1892)
Clupeosoma glaucinalis Hampson, 1917
Clupeosoma laniferalis Hampson, 1907
Clupeosoma margarisemale Munroe, 1977
Clupeosoma metachryson Hampson, 1897
Clupeosoma microthyrale Munroe, 1977
Clupeosoma orientalalis (Viette, 1954)
Clupeosoma pellucidalis Snellen, 1880
Clupeosoma rufistriata Hampson, 1917
Clupeosoma sericialis (Hampson, 1896)

Former species
Clupeosoma purpureum Inoue, 1982

References

Odontiinae
Crambidae genera